Gellunu Furaana is a Maldivian romantic horror drama television series developed for VMedia by Yoosuf Shafeeu. The series stars Ali Azim, Irufana Ibrahim, Ali Shahid and Aminath Ziyadha in pivotal roles. The first episode of the series was released on VTV on 7 May 2019. Filming for the series took place in B. Dharavandhoo.

Premise
Munthasir Ali Azim, visits his best-friend, Rashid, at B. Dharavandhoo during his semester break and he is continuously met with a strange girl (Irufana Ibrahim) who leads him with suspicious questions for Rashid.

Cast and characters
 Ali Azim as Munthasir
 Irufana Ibrahim as Haifa
 Ali Shahid as Jaleel
 Aminath Ziyadha as Shaaira
 Lubna as Zeeniya
 Hussain Nasif as Rashid
 Aminath Fazla
 Jauza Jaufar

Soundtrack

Release
The first episode among the five episodes was released on 7 May 2019, on the occasion of 1440 Ramadan. A new episode was released on Tuesday at 23:30 of every week.

References

Serial drama television series